The Swedish Radio Symphony Orchestra is a Swedish radio orchestra based in Stockholm, affiliated with Sveriges Radio (Sweden's Radio). Its principal performing venue is the Berwaldhallen (Berwald Hall). The orchestra broadcasts concerts on the Swedish Radio-P2 network.

History

One of the precursor ensembles to the current orchestra was the Radioorkestern (Radio Orchestra), whose chief conductors included Nils Grevillius (1927–1939) and Tor Mann (1939–1959). In 1965, the Radioorkestern was merged with another orchestra from Swedish Radio, the Underhållningsorkestern (Entertainment Orchestra), under the new name of the Swedish Radio Symphony Orchestra.  Sergiu Celibidache was the newly formed orchestra's first principal conductor, from 1965 to 1971. In 1979, the orchestra took up residence at the Berwaldhallen.

Since 2007, the orchestra's principal conductor is Daniel Harding. In September 2009, the orchestra announced the first extension of Harding's contract as principal conductor, through 2012. In April 2013, the orchestra announced a second extension of Harding's contract through 2015. In October 2018, the orchestra announced the extension of Harding's contract as principal conductor through 2023, along with granting him the new title of konstnärlig ledare (artistic leader). In November 2021, the orchestra announced an additional extension of Harding's contract through 2025.

Herbert Blomstedt, principal conductor of the orchestra from 1977 to 1982, now has the title of förste hedersdirigent (first honorary conductor) with the orchestra.  Valery Gergiev and Esa-Pekka Salonen also hold the title of hedersdirigent (honorary conductor) with the orchestra.  In December 2017, the orchestra announced the appointment of Klaus Mäkelä as its next principal guest conductor, effective with the 2018–2019 season.  Mäkelä is the youngest-ever appointment to a titled post with the orchestra.

Principal conductors
 Sergiu Celibidache (1965–1971)
 Herbert Blomstedt (1977–1982)
 Esa-Pekka Salonen (1984–1995)
 Yevgeny Svetlanov (1997–1999)
 Manfred Honeck (2000–2006)
 Daniel Harding (2007–present)

References

External links

 Official Swedish-language website of the Swedish Radio Symphony Orchestra 

Music in Stockholm
Musical groups established in 1965
Radio and television orchestras
Swedish symphony orchestras